Parya (Quechua for reddish, copper or sparrow, Hispanicized spelling Paria) is a  mountain in the Andes of Peru. It is situated in the Ayacucho Region, Huanca Sancos Province, Lucanamarca District. Parya lies northeast of Qallaqucha.

References

Mountains of Peru
Mountains of Ayacucho Region